Nicrosil is a nickel alloy containing about 14.4% chromium, 1.4% silicon, and (in some sources) 0.1% magnesium.

Nicrosil is used as the positive leg of type N thermocouples.  In this application another nickel alloy, Nisil, is used as the negative leg. The Nicrosil alloy in this case does not contain magnesium.

References

External links
  Materials properties of thermocouple wires sold by Omega Engineering, Inc.
 
 Data sheets NICROSIL 

Nickel alloys
Silicon alloys
Chromium alloys
Refractory metals